JIS University is a private university located near Agarpara, West Bengal, India It was established in 2014 under JIS University Act, 2014. JIS University is a multi-disciplinary, unitary & non-affiliating university, offering courses in engineering, technology, sciences, humanities, law, pharmacy and management studies.

References

External links
 Official Website

Private universities in India
Universities in Kolkata
Universities and colleges in North 24 Parganas district
Educational institutions established in 2014
2014 establishments in West Bengal